Yodhin Punja (born 24 April 1999) is a cricketer who plays for the United Arab Emirates national cricket team. He made his first-class debut for the United Arab Emirates against Hong Kong in the 2015–17 ICC Intercontinental Cup tournament on 11 November 2015. He made his One Day International (ODI) debut against Hong Kong in the 2015–17 ICC World Cricket League Championship on 16 November 2015. He became the youngest cricketer to play first-class and ODI cricket for the UAE.

References

External links
 

1999 births
Living people
Emirati cricketers
United Arab Emirates One Day International cricketers
Place of birth missing (living people)
Cardiff MCCU cricketers
Indian expatriate sportspeople in the United Arab Emirates